Otto Decker (born 19 September 1930) is a German-American former soccer player who earned one cap, scoring two goals, with the U.S. national team in 1953.

Youth
Decker and his brother Rolf were born in Germany, but grew up in England. In March 1939, their parents, Ilse and Hans, sent the two boys to England as part of the kindertransport at the outset of the Holocaust.

Decker attended the Royal Grammar School, High Wycombe, England, from 1948 to 1950 after transferring from Wycombe Technical Institute in 1948. While at RGS, he played both soccer and cricket, as the wicket keeper.

National team
Decker earned his lone cap as a second-half substitute in the only U.S. game of 1953, a 6–3 loss to England. He came on at halftime and scored in the 59th and 67th minutes.

He represented the U.S. as a halfback in soccer at the 1965 Maccabiah Games in Israel.

References

External links
 
 

American soccer players
Competitors at the 1965 Maccabiah Games
Maccabiah Games footballers
Maccabiah Games competitors for the United States
English footballers
Wycombe Wanderers F.C. players
German emigrants to the United States
Kindertransport refugees
Jewish American sportspeople
People educated at the Royal Grammar School, High Wycombe
United States men's international soccer players
American Soccer League (1933–1983) players
New York Hakoah players
1930 births
Living people
Association football forwards
English expatriate sportspeople in the United States
Expatriate soccer players in the United States
English expatriate footballers
People educated at John Hampden Grammar School
21st-century American Jews